The 43rd Canadian Parliament was in session from December 5, 2019, to August 15, 2021, with the membership of its Lower House, the House of Commons of Canada, having been determined by the results of the 2019 federal election held on October 21, 2019. Parliament officially resumed on December 5, 2019, with the election of a new Speaker, Anthony Rota, followed by a Speech from the Throne the following day. On August 15, 2021, Prime Minister Justin Trudeau advised Governor General Mary Simon to dissolve Parliament and issue the writ of election, leading to a 5-week election campaign period for the 2021 federal election.

Timeline

2019

 October 21, 2019: In the 43rd Canadian federal election, the incumbent Liberal Party lost its majority but won the most seats in the House of Commons.
 October 23, 2019: The Liberals ruled out any "formal or informal" coalition government with any other party.
 October 29, 2019: Incumbent prime minister Justin Trudeau met with Governor General Julie Payette to officially confirm that he intended to form a government.
 October 30, 2019: Green Party leader Elizabeth May, MP for Saanich—Gulf Islands, announced her interest in running for Speaker of the House of Commons, a position that would necessitate stepping down from her position as party leader.
 November 3, 2019: The Liberals announced that Trudeau would meet with opposition leaders during the week of November 11 to see if any common ground existed.
 November 4, 2019: Elizabeth May resigned as leader of the Green Party effective immediately and ruled out a bid for Speaker. May announced that she will remain an MP and named deputy Green Party leader Jo-Ann Roberts as the party's interim leader until her successor is chosen.
 November 6, 2019: The Conservative caucus voted against using a section of federal law that would have given them the authority to remove Andrew Scheer as party leader.
 November 18, 2019: Maxime Bernier announced that he will stay on as leader of the People's Party and that he will run again in the 44th Canadian election, or before then, if there is a by-election.
 November 20, 2019: The new Cabinet was sworn in, the first overseen by Governor General Julie Payette.
 December 5, 2019: The 43rd Parliament was convened. Anthony Rota was elected as the new Speaker of the House and the Throne Speech was read.
 December 12, 2019: Andrew Scheer announces his intention to resign as leader of the Conservative Party of Canada but stay on as MP for Regina—Qu'Appelle.

2020
 June 6, 2020: Kitchener South—Hespeler MP Marwan Tabbara resigned from the Liberal caucus after being charged with assault, break and enter and criminal harassment.
 August 17, 2020: Liberal Finance Minister Bill Morneau resigned from cabinet and as the MP for Toronto Centre, amid controversy relating to the WE scandal. He planned to bid for the Secretary-General of OECD.

 August 18, 2020: Prime Minister Trudeau prorogues Parliament until September 23.
 August 23–24, 2020: The Conservative Party held a leadership election to replace Andrew Scheer. The original date of June 27 had been postponed due to the coronavirus pandemic. Durham MP Erin O'Toole was elected as the new Conservative leader.
 September 1, 2020: Liberal Michael Levitt resigned as MP for York Centre to become the President and CEO of the Canadian Friends of Simon Wiesenthal Centre for Holocaust Studies, necessitating a by-election in the riding.

 September 23, 2020: Parliament came back into session. Speech from the Throne.
 October 3, 2020: Annamie Paul wins the 2020 Green Party leadership election to replace Elizabeth May.
 October 26, 2020: By-elections were held in the ridings of Toronto Centre and York Centre, electing Liberal candidates Marci Ien and Ya'ara Saks, respectively.
 November 9, 2020: Don Valley East MP Yasmin Ratansi resigned from the Liberal caucus after a CBC News investigation revealed she had violated parliamentary rules on Nepotism.

2021
 January 12, 2021: Mississauga—Malton MP Navdeep Bains, the Minister of Innovation, Science and Industry, resigned from the cabinet. A larger cabinet reshuffle took place.
 January 20, 2021: Hastings—Lennox and Addington MP Derek Sloan was expelled from the Conservative caucus after accepting donations from white supremacist Paul Fromm.
 January 21, 2021: Governor-General Julie Payette and her secretary Assunta Di Lorenzo resign after an investigation reveals they presided over a toxic workplace.
 January 25, 2021: Brampton Centre MP Ramesh Sangha was removed from the Liberal caucus because of his spreading claims against multiple other Liberal MPs that they were harbouring support for the Khalistan movement.
 May 11, 2021: Conservative Diane Finley, who represented Haldimand—Norfolk, resigned as an MP, leaving a vacancy. A by-election was pending.
 June 10, 2021: Green MP Jenica Atwin, representing Fredericton, crossed the floor to join the Liberals.
 June 21, 2021: the Trudeau government caused the Attorney-General to take House Speaker Anthony Rota to the Federal Court of Canada over his order that the Commons be provided documents concerning the dismissal by the PHAC of Xiangguo Qiu and her husband.
 August 15, 2021: Governor General Mary Simon (at the request of Prime Minister Trudeau) dissolves the 43rd Parliament & sets the election date for September 20, 2021.

First session
The first session of the 43rd Parliament opened on December 5, 2019, with the speech from the throne delivered by Governor General Julie Payette. Although several bills were introduced, the agenda was overtaken by the COVID-19 pandemic. Before Parliament implemented a five-week closure on March 13, 2020, the Canada–United States–Mexico Agreement Implementation Act was given all three Senate readings and royal assent in one day, the only non-appropriation bill adopted before the closure.

However, Parliament reconvened for one day, on March 24, 2020, to introduce and adopt the COVID-19 Emergency Response Act (Bill C-13) with unanimous consent. Among other provisions, the bill doubled the GST/HST credit for the 2019 tax year, added $300 to the May 2020 Canada Child Benefit, paused (for 6 months) repayments of Canada Student Loans, immediately transferred $500 million to the provinces, amended the Patent Act to allow government to use a patented invention without the permission until September 30 to respond to a public health emergency, and enacted the Canada Emergency Response Benefit Act and the Public Health Events of National Concern Payments Act. They again reconvened for one day, on April 11, for the COVID-19 Emergency Response Act, No. 2 (Bill C-14) which replaced the previous bill's temporary wage subsidies with the expanded Canada Emergency Wage Subsidy program and extended it to September 30. Similarly, the House of Commons reconvened on April 29 and the Senate on May 1 for the Canada Emergency Student Benefit Act (Bill C-15) to create the Canada Emergency Student Benefit and the Canada Student Service Grant. After a failed attempt in June, Parliament met again between July 20–22 for An Act respecting further COVID-19 measures (Bill C-20) which further extended and amended the Canada Emergency Wage Subsidy, provided a one-time $600 payment to persons with disabilities, and enacted the Time Limits and Other Periods Act (COVID-19).

During that time, in spring and summer 2020, the Liberal Party had three Members of Parliament resign and the Conservative Party elected a new leader. Initiated after Andrew Scheer's December 2019 announcement of his impending resignation as leader, the Conservative Party leadership election resulted in Durham MP Erin O'Toole becoming the new party leader as of August 24.  Marwan Tabbara of Kitchener South-Hespeler changed his affiliation to Independent in June upon the news release that the Guelph Police Service had charged him with counts of assault, criminal harassment, breaking and entering and committing an indictable offence relating to an incident that occurred in April. Effective September 1, York Centre MP Michael Levitt resigned to become President and CEO of the Canadian Friends of Simon Wiesenthal Centre for Holocaust Studies. Effective August 17, Toronto Centre MP Bill Morneau resigned from his position as Canadian Finance Minister and his seat in Parliament reportedly due to his role in the WE Charity controversy and disagreements with Prime Minister Justin Trudeau over spending federal funds on managing COVID-19's economic impact. The next day, upon naming Chrystia Freeland to replace Morneau as Finance Minister, the Prime Minister prorogued Parliament, ending the first session.

First prorogation
On 18 August 2020, Trudeau asked Governor-General Julie Payette to prorogue Parliament; she acceded to his request.

On September 18, 2020 Minister of Health Patty Hajdu accepted the resignation of Tina Namiesniowski, who was up until then president of the PHAC. Namiesniowski resigned 17 months into her five-year tenure, which had begun on May 6, 2019. Her resignation followed the resignation of Sally Thornton, Vice-president of the Health Security Infrastructure Branch who had been in charge of the pandemic early warning system and emergency stockpile, and who had resigned earlier in the week. Namiesniowski, who had been appointed as a "senior official" in the Privy Council Office, was replaced three days later by Iain Stewart, who was formerly at the NRC.

Second session
On September 23, 2020, Parliament resumed with a new throne speech read by Governor General Payette. During this second session, Payette would resign following a workplace review of Rideau Hall. The throne speech was followed by a separate televised address (at 6:30 p.m. EDT) from Prime Minister Trudeau. At the time of the speech, both the Leader of the Opposition O'Toole and Bloc Québécois leader Yves-François Blanchet were in quarantine after being infected with COVID earlier in the month. The first two bills adopted (Bills C-4 and C-9), as well as Bill C-14 and C-24, provided further federal aid related to COVID-19. With the Canada Emergency Response Benefit ending, the bills created the Canada Recovery Benefit as an income support for those not eligible for employment insurance, in addition to the Canada Recovery Caregiving Benefit, the Canada Recovery Sickness Benefit and the Canada Emergency Rent Subsidy, and the bills extended the Canada Emergency Wage Subsidy to June 2021. Bill C-14 directly transferred funds for Covid-related measures.

Bill C-30 implemented the legislative items from the 2021 budget, including additional COVID-19 aid in the form of creating the Canada Recovery Hiring Program, extending both the Canada Emergency Wage Subsidy and Canada Emergency Rent Subsidy to the end of  September, extending the Canada Recovery Benefit at a reduced rate, transferring $1 billion to provinces to help implement their immunization plans, and pausing the applicability of interest on federal student and apprentice loans to March  2023; Old Age Security was increased by 10% with a one-time payment of $500; the federal minimum wage  was increased to $15.00 per hour; face masks and shields were added to the list of products exempted from GST/HST; GST/HST was made applicable to payments to foreign digital products or services such as streaming subscriptions or short-term accommodations; the Canada Health Transfer was increased by $4 billion. In addition, the same bill provided $2.2 billion in additional payments for infrastructure projects funded through the Gas Tax Fund while renaming it the Canada Community-Building Fund, provided $3 billion to the Hibernia project, increased the number of judges on federal courts, and reduced the number of hours (or the amount of earnings from self-employment) required to qualify for unemployment benefits. It also enacted the new Retail Payment Activities Act to regulate payment service providers.

Addressing the federal government's relationship with Indigenous peoples, Bill C-15 adopted the United Nations Declaration on the Rights of Indigenous Peoples Act, while Bills C-5 and C-8 enacted call to actions 80 and 94 of the Truth and Reconciliation Commission making September 30 a public holiday titled National Day for Truth and Reconciliation and amended the Oath of Citizenship to state "...I will faithfully observe the laws of Canada, including the Constitution, which recognizes and affirms the Aboriginal and treaty rights of First Nations, Inuit and Métis peoples, and fulfil my duties as a Canadian citizen." Other legislation adopted during the second session included Bills C-7 and C-12, both adopted with NDP and Bloc support, to address court findings on the previous parliament's legalization of medical assistance in dying and to fulfil Canada's commitment to Nationally Determined Contributions under the Paris Agreement for reducing greenhouse gas emissions. Bills C-18 and C-29, both adopted with Conservative support, addressed the Brexit's impact on CETA and ended the Port of Montreal strike.

Six private member bills and one senate public bill received royal assent:
Larry Maguire's An Act to amend the Income Tax Act (transfer of small business or family farm or fishing corporation) (Bill C-208) applies the capital gains tax instead of the dividend tax to inter-generational transfers,
Len Webber's An Act to amend the Canada Revenue Agency Act (organ and tissue donors)  (Bill C-210) allows Canadians to indicate their intent to sign up as a donor through their annual income tax return,
Kevin Waugh's An Act to amend the Criminal Code (sports betting) (Bill C-218) allows a province's lottery corporation to offer betting on single sport events, athletic contests, races and fights,
Matt Jeneroux's An Act to amend the Canada Labour Code (bereavement leave) (Bill C-220) extends bereavement leave from 5 to 10 days and entitles employees already on compassionate care leave to also claim bereavement leave,
Richard Bragdon's An Act to establish a framework to reduce recidivism (Bill C-228) requires the Minister of Public Safety and Emergency Preparedness, within one year, to develop a federal framework to reduce recidivism,
Sonia Sidhu's An Act to establish a national framework for diabetes (Bill C-237) requires the Minister of Health, within one year, to develop a framework to improve access to information on diabetes prevention and treatment,
Jim Munson's An Act respecting Kindness Week  (Bill S-223) designates the third week of February in each and every year as "Kindness Week".

Canadian Ministry
The 29th Canadian Ministry had continued from the 42nd Parliament. On November 20, 2019, a month after the election, the Prime Minister re-organized his cabinet to align with government priorities and replace members who had retired or been defeated. Chrystia Freeland was named Deputy Prime Minister and Minister of Intergovernmental Affairs. Of those continuing on in their existing roles, Bill Morneau continued as Minister of Finance, David Lametti as Minister of Justice, Harjit Sajjan as Minister of National Defence, and Navdeep Bains as Minister of Innovation, Science and Industry. In shuffling existing cabinet ministers, Patty Hajdu became the new Minister of Health, François-Philippe Champagne the new Minister of Foreign Affairs, Jonathan Wilkinson the new Minister of Environment and Climate Change, Bernadette Jordan the new Minister of Fisheries and Oceans, Seamus O'Regan the new Minister of Natural Resources, and Bill Blair the new Minister of Public Safety and Emergency Preparedness. There were seven newcomers to cabinet including Dan Vandal becoming Minister of Northern Affairs, Marc Miller the Minister of Indigenous Services, and Steven Guilbeault the Minister of Canadian Heritage.

With Morneau's resignation in August 2020, Freeland was moved over to become Minister of Finance, with the Ministry of Intergovernmental Affairs being returned to Dominic LeBlanc's portfolio. With Navdeep Bains' January 2021 announcement that he would not be seeking reelection, he was replaced as Innovation Minister by François-Philippe Champagne, with Marc Garneau taking over Champagne's Minister of Foreign Affairs role, Omar Alghabra being promoted to cabinet to become the new Minister of Transport, and Jim Carr returning to cabinet (as a Minister without portfolio) after a 1 year absence to receive medical treatments.

Senate
In the month before the 43rd Parliament convened, two new groups organized under the Rules of the Senate. The Independent Senators Group (ISG), whose members did not maintain membership with any other political party, continued from the previous parliament as the largest organized group. However, 7 of its members, along with 3 Conservative Party senators and one unaffiliated senator, had split-off to form the Canadian Senators Group which allowed its members to also be members of political parties but not be subject to a party whip. Then on November 14, the Senate Liberal Caucus disbanded to form the Progressive Senate Group. When 43rd Parliament convened on December 5, the senate consisted of 100 members, 51 belonging to the ISG, 24 caucusing with the Conservative Party, 13 with the Canadian Senators Group, 8 with the Progressive Senate Group, and 4 remaining non-affiliated. Senator Marc Gold left the ISG on January 24, 2020, to become the Representative of the Government in the Senate. Of those who left the Senate during the 43rd Parliament, 10 had reached the mandatory retirement age, including the last remaining senator appointed by Brian Mulroney, 3 voluntarily resigned and two senators (Elaine McCoy and Judith Keating) died while in office. The Prime-Minister appointment two new senators on January 31, 2020: Judith Keating and legal ethicist Brent Cotter. The next three appointments were made on June 22, 2021: lawyer Bernadette Clement, trade unionist Hassan Yussuff and executive of the Saint John Port Authority Jim Quinn. Another 5 were appointed a month later, on July 29, 2021: Clément Gignac, Amina Gerba and Michèle Audette of Quebec, Mayor of Banff Karen Sorensen, and lawyer David Arnot.

Party standings

Representation by Province/Territory

House of Commons 
For background on the current representation, see:

 The representation acts in the List of Canadian constitutional documents
 Elections Canada's history on the representation formula (including the 1985 Representation Act, but any subsequent acts such as the 1999 Constitution Act or the 2011 Fair Representation Act).
 Canadian Parliamentary Review's proposal for fairer representation for small provinces (around the time of the 2011 representation formula revision).

Senate 

 For historical and current representation in the Senate, see Senate of Canada's history and current representation.

Officeholders
The officers of Parliament for the 43rd Parliament are set out below.

Party leaders
 Prime Minister of Canada: Rt. Hon. Justin Trudeau (Liberal)
 Leader of the Opposition: Hon. Andrew Scheer (Conservative) (27 May 2017 – 24 August 2020)
 Leader of the Opposition: Hon. Erin O’Toole (Conservative) (24 August 2020 – present)
 Leader of the Bloc Québécois: Yves-François Blanchet (Third Party)
 Leader of the New Democratic Party: Jagmeet Singh (Fourth Party)

Rump groups without official party status
 Leader of the Green Party: Annamie Paul (from outside of the House; since October 3, 2020)
 Parliamentary leader of the Green Party: Elizabeth May (since November 4, 2019, previously party leader)

Changes to party standings

House of Commons

Membership changes

The party standings in the House of Commons have changed as follows:

Senate

Membership changes

References

 
2019 establishments in Canada
2021 disestablishments in Canada
Justin Trudeau
Minority governments